Tollgate Metro station is a Metro railway station on Line 1 Extension of the Chennai Metro. The station is one of the 26 stations along the Blue Line (Chennai Metro) of the Chennai Metro. The station will serve the neighbourhoods of Tollgate and other northern suburbs of Chennai.

History
The station was inaugurated on 14 February 2021, with the inauguration of the northern extension of Blue line of Phase I.

The station

Structure
Tollgate is an elevated Metro station situated on the Blue Line (Chennai Metro).

Station layout

See also
 Chennai
 List of Chennai metro stations
 Railway stations in Chennai

References

External links
 

 UrbanRail.Net – descriptions of all metro systems in the world, each with a schematic map showing all stations.

Chennai Metro stations
Railway stations in Chennai